Gunnar Gunnarsson (born 2 June 1961) is an Icelandic former handball player who competed in the 1992 Summer Olympics. He was known for his speed and agility across the court.

References

1961 births
Living people
Gunnar Gunnarsson
Gunnar Gunnarsson
Handball players at the 1992 Summer Olympics